Logistic equation can refer to:

Logistic map, a nonlinear recurrence relation that plays a prominent role in chaos theory
Logistic regression, a regression technique that transforms the dependent variable using the logistic function
Logistic differential equation, a differential equation for population dynamics proposed by Pierre François Verhulst

See also

Logistic function